Kate Soper (born 1981) is a composer and vocalist, notable for her innovative treatment of the vocal mechanism. Her work as both a composer and performer explores the  dramatic and affective qualities of the human voice, capitalizing on extended vocal and instrumental techniques. She was a recent Guggenheim Fellow as well as a 2012–13 fellow of the Radcliffe Institute for Advanced Study. She was a finalist for the 2017 Pulitzer Prize in Music for her chamber opera, Ipsa Dixit.

Style
In addition to composing, Soper performs frequently as a new music soprano in her own works and the works of others, and many of her vocal works were developed with herself in mind as performer.  Her compositional style has been deemed "exquisitely quirky"  with "seamless commingling of not only lines but of actual instrumentation and fingering with another player."

Commissions 
Recent commissions for work as a performer/composer include a 2012 Guggenheim fellowship for a one-act opera with original libretto, Here Be Sirens; a Koussevitsky Commission for a music theatre work performed with Alarm Will Sound; and now is forever for soprano and orchestra from the American Composers Orchestra.

Wet Ink 
Since 2006, Soper has served as a co-director and vocalist for Wet Ink, a New York-based new music ensemble founded in 1998 and dedicated to the presentation of programs of new music, with a focus on creating, promoting, and organizing American music. In addition to a New York concert season featuring many of the city's freelancers, Wet Ink performs as a septet consisting of a core group of composer-performers that collaborate in a band-like fashion, writing, improvising, preparing, and touring pieces together over long stretches of time. Alongside fellow composer/directors Alex Mincek (saxophone/founding member), Sam Pluta (electronics), Eric Wubbels (piano), and performers Ian Antonio (percussion), Erin Lesser (founding member, flute), and Josh Modney (violin), Soper frequently tours, performs with, and writes for the Wet Ink Ensemble. Her large-scale monodrama for the group, Voices from the Killing Jar, was released on Carrier Records in 2014.

Awards and fellowships 
Radcliffe Institute for Advanced Study Fellow, 2012–2013
Koussevitsky Foundation Grant, 2012
John Simon Guggenheim Memorial Foundation Fellow, 2012
Lili Boulanger Memorial Fund Annual Prize Winner, 2012
Fromm Music Foundation Fromm Commission, 2008
Tanglewood Music Center Fellow, 2006.

List of works

Vocal 
Now is forever (soprano and orchestra), 2012–2013
The Crito (soprano and percussion), 2012
Only the words themselves mean what they say (soprano and flute), 2010–2011
cipher (soprano and violin), 2011–12
Nadja (soprano and string quartet), upcoming 2013
Voices from the Killing Jar (voice, flute, sax/clarinet, piano, violin/trumpet, piano, electronics), 2010–12
Helen Enfettered (soprano, mezzo-soprano, clarinet, trumpet, piano, violin, viola, cello, contrabass), 2009, a setting of the "e" chapter of Christian Bök's Eunoia.
Door (voice, flute, saxophone, electric guitar, accordion), 2007
Songs for Nobody (two sopranos and alto), 2006
What you think of in the city (baritone, viola, cello), 2002
Ipsa Dixit (voice, violin, flute, percussion), 2016

Instrumental 
Entre les Calanques (orchestra; original chamber version with flute, cello, bassoon, two horns, three violins, three violas, two cellos, two contrabasses), 2010
Nine Rakes (wind orchestra), 2007
The door in the wall (flute, oboe, two clarinets, bassoon, horn, trumpet, tn, piano, two percussionist, two violins, viola, cello, contrabass), 2011, revised 2012
What makes it go (flute, oboe, two clarinets, bassoon, horn, trumpet, tn, piano, percussion, two violins, viola, cello, contrabass; original version with three violins, three violas, three cellos, three contrabasses) 2010, original version 2008
As the Crow Flies (flute, clarinet, two saxophones, horn, trumpet, trombone, electric guitar, accordion, piccolo, violin, viola, cello, contrabass), 2007
Didcas (brass septet), 2006
Crosshatch (flute, clarinet, horn, trumpet, trombone, piccolo, violin, viola, cello, contrabass), 2005
In the Reign of Harad IV (amplified percussion trio), upcoming, 2013
Wolf (piano four hands and two percussionists), 2010
The Sleep Side (clarinet, trumpet, piano, and percussion), 2010
I had a Slow Thought on a Hard Day (alto saxophone and accordion), 2008
Into that World Inverted (horn and piano), 2006, revised 2010
Purl (flute and percussion), 2006
Knock (solo percussion), 2006

Theatrical 
I Was Here I Was I (singers and chamber orchestra), 2014
Here be Sirens (three voices, piano), 2014

Electronic 
Five One-liners (tape), 2003

References

American women classical composers
American classical composers
Avant-garde composers
Columbia University School of the Arts alumni
Rice University alumni
1981 births
Living people
University of Michigan people
21st-century American composers
21st-century American women musicians
People from Ann Arbor, Michigan
21st-century women composers